Cory's Ancient Fragments is compendium of fragments from ancient writers collected and published by the antiquarian and miscellaneous writer Isaac Preston Cory. The first edition was published in 1826, further followed by a revised edition containing various ancient King List's (e.g. Manetho). A further enlarged edition appeared in 1876, edited by historian E. Richmond Hodges which added many more ancient fragments.

Fragments (1826, 1832 ed.)

Phoenician 

Sanchuniathon

Babylonian 

Berossus, Abydenus, Nicolaus of Damascus, Alexander Polyhistor, Eupolemus, Thallus, 
Ctesias, Diodorus Siculus, Castor of Rhodes, Herodotus, Marcus Velleius Paterculus

Egyptian 

Manetho, Artapanus, Diodorus Siculus, Chaeremon of Alexandria

Manetho copied down from the ancient Egyptian inscriptions a list of eight successive Persian kings, beginning with Cambyses, the son of Cyrus the Great, at the request of Ptolemy Philadelphus (266 BCE – 228 BCE).
Cambyses (Artaxerxes) b. Cyrus = reigned over Persia, his own kingdom, for 5 years, and over Egypt for 6 years. 
Darius (II), the son of Hystaspes = reigned 36 years.
Xerxes (Artaxerxes), the Great, b. Darius = reigned 21 years. 
Artabanus = reigned 7 months.
Artaxerxes (Cyrus) b. Xerxes the Great = reigned 41 years.
Xerxes = reigned 2 months.
Sogdianus = reigned 7 months.
Darius (III), the son of Xerxes = reigned 19 years.

It is to be noted here that between Cambyses' reign and Darius, the son of Hystaspes, there was an interim period whereby the Magi ruled over Persia. This important anecdote is supplied by Herodotus who wrote the Magian ruled Persia for 7 months after the death of Cambyses. Josephus, on the other hand, says they obtained the government of the Persians for a year.

Tyrian 

Menander of Ephesus

Indian 

Megasthenes, Cleitarchus

Carthaginian 

Hanno the Navigator

Fragments (1876 ed.)

Hodges added more ancient fragments including a section of "miscellaneous fragments" of ancient writers (e.g. Sallust, Agatharchides). However, Hodge removed Cory's original fragments from neoplatonists, which he considered to be forgeries..

External links
 Cory's Ancient Fragments, 1832 ed.
 Cory's Ancient Fragments, 1876 ed.

Classics publications
1826 non-fiction books